Social reproduction describes the reproduction of social structures and systems, mainly on the basis of particular preconditions in demographics, education and inheritance of material property or legal titles (as earlier with aristocracy). Reproduction is understood as the maintenance and continuation of existing social relations. Originally proposed by Karl Marx in Das Kapital, this concept is a variety of Marx's notion of economic reproduction.

According to sociologist Pierre Bourdieu, there are four types of capital that contribute to social reproduction in society: economic capital, cultural capital, social capital and symbolic capital. 

Social reproduction in this sense is distinct from the term as it is used in Marxist feminism to discuss reproductive labor. In that application, it is used to explain the role of women in wider social and class structures, and their (often unrecognized) contribution to the capitalist economy via their (traditional) role within the household as both child-bearers and family caretakers, and by extension women's  role as providers of free labor that is necessary to produce and maintain current and future workers.

Four types of capital
All four of Pierre Bourdieu's forms of capital play a role in social reproduction, as capital is passed from generation to generation and keeps people in the same social class as their parents before them. This keeps reproducing inequality through the system of social stratification. The four types of capital are:

 Economic capital: the income and wealth of a person, which may well come along with one's inheritance of cultural capital.
 Cultural capital: the shared outlook, beliefs, knowledge, and skills that are passed between generations, which may in turn influence human capital.
 Human capital: the education and job training a person receives, and which contributes to the likelihood  that one will acquire  social capital.
 Social capital: the social network to which one belongs, which can largely influence one's ability to find opportunities, especially employment.

In education 

Social reproduction, when co-opted with cultural reproduction, allows for sociology of education to assume its role. Education is an attempt at leveling the playing field by allowing those in poorer classes a chance to move up. However, it fails in many critical ways; for example, education is costly: better schools mean better equipment, better books, and better teachers, all of which remain beyond the pay grade of the poverty line. Thus, higher education becomes exclusive to higher classes, leaving people of lower classes with much less to work with, as well as fewer opportunities.

The education system in many high-income countries polarizes individuals from a young age. It creates elites who care little for those in the classes beneath them and believe that they should earn extraordinarily more than everyone else, all the while defining people by their jobs, concluding that those with low-paid jobs for that reason live in relative poverty. The system strives to maintain the status quo so children can be greatly denigrated. As the rich take in an increasing amount of the country's wealth, there is less and less for the general populace, resulting in poorer education.

Education in the United States 
Statistics show that the majority of dropouts are below the poverty line. Due to a lack of capital, they do not complete their education, seeing it as less convenient to complete schooling rather than find work, and support themselves or their families. Usually, these dropouts consist of the minority groups, such as Hispanics and African Americans. Many drop out due to lack of funds to continue their education, some are single parents, or have had a deceased parent, which makes it difficult to study and work at the same time. These issues are rarely seen in higher classes, making it less likely for them to drop out and reject opportunities.

In health and illness 
The sociology of health and illness studies how social life affects morbidity and mortality rate, and vice versa. Social reproduction is involved in this field when it comes to how inequalities affect the health of people in particular classes.

The greater the economic inequality, the more of a toll it takes on the health of the populace, from life expectancy to infant mortality, and in cases like the U.S, increasing rates of obesity. Studies conducted on the population of high income countries make this apparent. It is not just simply poverty, though they do go hand in hand, but it also leads to a gap in social cohesion, which leads the general populace to be more stressed, fearful, and insecure.

In the majority of high-income countries, the top 1% live, on average, 10 years longer than the average 99%, statistically making those born into the poorer classes naturally have a shorter life span. This can be attributed to the top 1% having access to better healthcare. The bottom 99% may be disinclined to visit doctors and take cough medicine for more serious illnesses, and are disadvantaged especially in cases of incurable illnesses like AIDS where constant medicating with expensive, non-subsidized drugs is the only way to sustain a normal life.

Those born into a lower class are at a higher risk of suffering from illness. In the past, the poor suffered from hunger and starvation. However, in high-income countries like the U.S, the opposite is true. Food-insecure families are the most prone to high rates of obesity, especially in children. This can be attributed to the generally higher cost of healthful foods, a lack of education regarding healthy eating habits, and faster preparation times, causing fast foods, or other unhealthy alternatives to be consumed often for their ease of acquisition and generally low price. This leads to long-term epidemiological problems in which children who become obese maintain their obesity into their adult lives, suffering from associated ailments such as heart disease, high blood pressure, increased risk for several types of cancer, type 2 diabetes, stroke, infertility, arthritis, breathing difficulties and/or depression.

Social class system in the United States 

Social reproduction is the passing on of social inequality across generations. The upper class has many advantages; having money provides the ability to have even more resources to get ahead. The opposite is true for lower classes, where with less money, there are fewer resources. As Marx states, "[c]lass-struggle between capital and labor is forced into the background."

"Capitalism isn't working. Another world is possible" is an argument that is made by many protesters around the world, who gather in rallies more and more often every year. These protests are more prevalent in higher-income countries where most of the 1% live like the U.S and the U.K. with a growing social cohesion among protesters because the vast majority of people in rich countries are suffering due to increasing inequalities. Many of the poor have begun to depend on the state rather than their own wages. All the while, their descendants will be raised in a fixed system that favors the elites, so they are bound to the same class they were born in.

Social reproduction revolves around the understanding that rich breed rich, and the poor breed poor: those born into a particular class are more often than not bound to live their lives in that class. The following statistics are of the U.S. population.

Lower class 

The lower class is a class afflicted by a cycle of poverty, homelessness, and unemployment. This is seen as they suffer from the inability to pay bills some of which then find themselves living on the street, experiencing food insecurity as many families will find themselves going hungry least once a year, or lack of medical care where many cannot pay for medication or treatment for potentially fatal illnesses. All the while, this class is usually labelled by the media as being lazy, system abusers, or criminals. Those born into this class have lower class mobility due to restrictions on resources, such as money and access to better education. This class is a point of reference in social reproduction, comprising 15% to 20% of the U.S. population. The majority of those in the lower classes are minorities.

Working class 

The working class has a minimal education. They are usually physical laborers with little to no qualifications. They can also be seen working service industries, but are underpaid and no chance for promotions in their standings. Potential skilled workers who may at times work better-paying but dangerous jobs. Those born into this system usually have a torch of labor passed on to them, and they follow the same profession their family did. They comprise 30% to 40% of the U.S. population, and the majority are minorities.

Middle class 

The middle class consists of two divided classes. The lower half bears resemblance to those of lower classes, i.e., usually less educated with lower incomes, but they can be found in managerial positions, in education, as well as small business owners. The upper half consists of professionals and educated business owners. Those born into this class have the most diversity, either deciding to take up the torch or surpass their parents. The majority goes on to complete their educations, and maintain a career. They comprise 40% to 50% of the U.S. population. The majority is a blend.

Upper class 

The upper class is known to hold 25% of the wealth in the U.S.. This class shares something in common with the middle class. A division into two. The lower half who consist of new money, investments, and successful business owners. The majority who were originally Middle Class or rarely lower. The upper half consists of families who have been rich for generations. A point of reference in social reproduction brought along the ages. Those born into this class receive inheritances from those who die and so forth. Their descendants are sent off to the finest of schools leaving them with the most opportunities of all. They comprise 1% to 3% of the U.S. population. The lower half can be a blend, whereas the upper half consists of mostly white families.

References

Sociological terminology